Exhibition Park in Canberra (EPIC) is a 70 hectare showground and multi-building venue for exhibitions, conferences, and events located in the suburb of Lyneham (though commonly listed in the adjacent Mitchell) in Canberra, Australia.

Regular events
There are a number of events held regularly at EPIC but in 2020, and into 2021 many were postponed, cancelled or changed in format as a result of crowd and travel restrictions imposed during the COVID-19 pandemic in Australia.
 Summernats, an annual four-day car festival, at the beginning of January.
 Cancon, an annual games convention, over the Australia Day long weekend.
 The Royal Canberra Show, in late February.
 The National Folk Festival (Australia), over the Easter long weekend.
 The Capital Region Farmers Market, weekly.
 The Lifeline Bookfair, a biannual fundraising book fair
 The Canberra leg of Groovin' the Moo, an annual music festival held in regional centres (since 2019)
 The Handmade Canberra Market, held four times per year.

References

Buildings and structures in Canberra
Showgrounds in Australia